Miroslav Rizov (born on 10 October 1976) is a Bulgarian footballer currently playing for Bdin Vidin. Rizov is a left defender.

References

Bulgarian footballers
1976 births
Living people
PFC Pirin Blagoevgrad players
PFC Pirin Gotse Delchev players
First Professional Football League (Bulgaria) players

Association football defenders
Sportspeople from Blagoevgrad